The Original Bootleg Series from the Manticore Vaults is a four-volume "official bootleg" release by Emerson, Lake & Palmer on Castle Records containing live recordings. Each of the four volumes comprised four shows and contained seven or eight CDs. A two disc set of highlights from the first two volumes was released under the name Best of the Bootlegs in 2002.

Volume One

Volume Two

Volume Three

Volume Four

Best of the Bootlegs

Notes

References

External links
 discogs.com: Volume One
 discogs.com: Volume Two
 discogs.com: Volume Three
 discogs.com: Volume Four
 discogs.com: Best of the Bootlegs

Emerson, Lake & Palmer live albums
Live album series
2001 live albums
2002 live albums
2006 live albums